Lambertville House is located in Lambertville, Hunterdon County, New Jersey, United States. The building was built in 1812 by Captain John Lambert and was added to the National Register of Historic Places on September 6, 1978.

See also
National Register of Historic Places listings in Hunterdon County, New Jersey

References

Houses on the National Register of Historic Places in New Jersey
Italianate architecture in New Jersey
Houses completed in 1812
Houses in Hunterdon County, New Jersey
National Register of Historic Places in Hunterdon County, New Jersey
New Jersey Register of Historic Places
Lambertville, New Jersey